Ted Lipman (born 1953) is a former Canadian diplomat. He served in numerous roles including ambassador to North Korea and South Korea.

Life and career
He was born in Brazil and was raised in Rio de Janeiro, the United Kingdom, and Vancouver. His father was English and his mother was Russian. Lipman took Asian studies at University of British Columbia and studied Chinese history at Peking University.

In 1976, he became a member of the Canadian Department of External Affairs. Positions held by him there have included special projects liaison in the Corporate Planning Division, deputy director of the East Asia Trade Division, and director general of the North Asia Bureau.

Lipman's first work in Asia was to serve the Canadian embassy in Beijing from 1977 to 1980. Lipman then became the first Canadian trade commissioner in South China from 1982 to 1985. Other positions held by Lipman include Canadian consul general in Shanghai from 1995 to 1999, and minister at the Canadian embassy in Beijing between 1999 and 2001. Lipman became executive director of the Canadian Trade Office in Taipei in 2001, and held that position until 2004. Lipman has also worked in the United States three times: as a member of the United Nations General Assembly, as a consul and trade commissioner in New York City, and as a consul in Pittsburgh.

Despite being an immigrant to Canada, Lipman has commented that he has no difficulties in representing the country as a diplomat, stating that "Canada is a very free and fair country where people of various backgrounds thrive and that's part of our success."

In 2011 Lipman retired from the diplomatic service. He is currently the chief executive officer of the Robert H. N. Ho Family Foundation, providing professional leadership to the foundation as it carries out its dual missions: promoting Chinese culture, and encouraging a deeper understanding of Buddhist philosophy in contemporary society.

Family
Lipman is married to famous Chinese singer Zhu Zheqin, better known by her artist name Dadawa.

References

1953 births
Living people
People from Rio de Janeiro (city)
Brazilian people of English descent
Brazilian people of Russian descent
Brazilian emigrants to Canada
Canadian people of Russian descent
Canadian people of English descent
University of British Columbia alumni
Peking University alumni
Ambassadors of Canada to South Korea
Ambassadors of Canada to North Korea
20th-century diplomats
21st-century diplomats